Abhivadaye is a religious practice among Hindu men to introduce themselves to others especially the elders. It is practiced even today widely among the Brahmins.

Practice
The importance of giving respect to elders, in whole means it is an introduction of self with lineage.
It consists of a set of lines which is essentially used to introduce one's
 Pravara
 Gotra
 Sutrakaara or the author one has been following
 Branch of Veda one is versed
 One's own name
It varies based on one's Gotra. 

Examples: 

1.Someone belonging to the Kaushika Gotra has the following as his Abhivadaye:

Abhivaadaye Vaishwamaitra, Aghamarshana, Kaushika Thrayaarisheya, (Pravara) 
Kaushika Gotrah (Gotra)
Apasthambha Sutrah, (Sutra)
Yajussaakhaadhyaayee, (Veda)
Shri Venkatesha Sharmaa Naama aham Asmi (Name) 
Bhoh (Salutations)

Translation: I am saluting, having three Pravara Rishis Vishamitra, Aghamarshana and Kaushika, of Kaushika Gotra, following the rules or manual of Apasthambha, learning the branch of Veda called Yajur. I am Venkatesh Sharma by name. Your Honour.

2. Someone from Bharadwaja Gotrah and Samaveda tradition recites
"Abhivaadaye Angirasaha, Bharahaspatya, Bharadwaja Tryarisheya, Pravaranvita 
Bharadwaja gotraha,(Gotra)  
Drakhyayana Sutraha,(Sutra)  
Saamasaakha Adhyaayai (Veda)  
Shri GopalaKrishna Sharma Naama aham asmi (Name)  
Bhoh" (Salutations)

3. Someone belonging to Bhadarayana Gotra says the below :

Abhivaadaye Aangirasa, Bharshadasva, Raatitara ThrayaaRisheya pravaranvitha Bhadarayana Gotraha |
Aapasthambasoothraha  yaju: shakha adhyaayi Sri 'Gopala Krishna'(Replace with your name) Sharma Naama aham Asmibho ||

4. Someone belonging to Koundinya Gotra says:

Abhivaadaye Vasishta, Maithra varuna, Koundinya ThrayaaRisheya pravaranvitha Koundinya sa Gotraha |
Aapasthambasoothraha  yaju: shakha adhyaayi Sri 'Vishnu Deepak'(Replace with your name) Sharma Naama aham Asmibho ||

5. Someone belonging to the Moudgalya Gotra says:

Abhivaadaye Angirasa,Bharmyāśva,Moudgalya,Thrayaa Risheya, pravaranvitha, Moudgalya Gotraha |
Aapasthambasoothraha  yaju: shakha adhyaayi Sri 'Venkata Krishna'(Replace with your name) Sharma Naama aham Asmibho ||

References
 (7th edition).
 (1st edition).

External links

Hindu traditions